James Gilmore (September 20, 1786 – November 28, 1848) was a member of the Wisconsin State Assembly.

Biography
Gilmore was born in 1786 in Pawlet, Vermont. He died in 1848 in Jamestown, Wisconsin where he lived.

Assembly career
Gilmore was a member of the Assembly during the 1st Wisconsin Legislature in 1848, representing the 1st District of Grant County, Wisconsin. He was a Whig.

Notes

References

External links
 

People from Jamestown, Wisconsin
Members of the Wisconsin State Assembly
Wisconsin Whigs
19th-century American politicians
1786 births
1848 deaths
People from Pawlet, Vermont